Marsha M. Linehan (born May 5, 1943) is an American psychologist and author. She is the creator of dialectical behavior therapy (DBT), a type of psychotherapy that combines cognitive restructuring with acceptance, mindfulness, and shaping.

Linehan is an Emeritus Professor of Psychology, Adjunct Professor of Psychiatry and Behavioral Sciences at the University of Washington in Seattle and Director of the Behavioral Research and Therapy Clinics. Her primary research is in borderline personality disorder, the application of behavioral models to suicidal behaviors, and drug abuse. Allen Frances, in the foreword for Linehan's book Building a Life Worth Living, said Linehan is one of the two most influential "clinical innovators" in mental health, the other being Aaron Beck.

Early life and education
Linehan was born in Tulsa, Oklahoma on May 5, 1943, being the third of six children. She was diagnosed with schizophrenia at the Institute of Living in Hartford, Connecticut where she was an inpatient. Linehan was subjected to electroconvulsive therapy, seclusion, as well as Thorazine and Librium as treatment. During this time she dealt with suicidal behavior and although not diagnosed, she has said that she feels that she actually had borderline personality disorder. The symptoms she experienced then are similar to today's diagnostic criteria for borderline personality disorder. In a 2011 interview with The New York Times, Linehan said that she "does not remember" taking any psychiatric medication after leaving the Institute of Living when she was 18 years old.

Linehan graduated cum laude from Loyola University Chicago in 1968 with a B.Sc. in psychology. She earned an M.A. in 1970 and a Ph.D. in 1971, in social and experimental personality psychology. During her time at Loyola University, Linehan served as lecturer for the psychology program. In addition to her work in psychology, Linehan was trained in Zen meditation and became a Zen teacher.

Career
After leaving Loyola University, Linehan started a post doctoral internship at The Suicide Prevention and Crisis Service in Buffalo, New York between 1971 and 1972. During this time, Linehan served as an adjunct assistant professor at University at Buffalo, The State University of New York. From Buffalo, Linehan completed a Post-Doctoral fellowship in Behavior Modification at Stony Brook University. Linehan then returned to her alma mater Loyola University in 1973 and served as an adjunct professor at the university until 1975. During this same time Linehan also served as an assistant professor in psychology at the Catholic University of America in Washington, D.C. from 1973 to 1977.

In 1977, Linehan took a position at the University of Washington as an adjunct assistant professor in the Psychiatry and Behavior Sciences department. Linehan is now a professor of psychology and a professor of Psychiatry and Behavioral Sciences at the University of Washington and Director of the Behavioral Research and Therapy Clinics.

Linehan is the past-president of the Association for the Advancement of Behavior Therapy as well as of the Society of Clinical Psychology Division 12 American Psychological Association, a fellow of both the American Psychological Association and the American Psychopathological Association and a diplomate of the American Board of Behavioral Psychology. She is also the founder of the Suicide Strategic Planning Group, the DBT Strategic Planning Group, Behavioral Tech LLC and Behavioral Tech Research Inc.

Linehan developed dialectical behavior therapy (DBT) – a variation of traditional cognitive behavioral therapy (CBT) with elements of acceptance and mindfulness, as a result of her own mental illness. In 1967, while she prayed in a small Catholic chapel in Chicago, she said: One night I was kneeling in there, looking up at the cross, and the whole place became gold – and suddenly I felt something coming toward me ... It was this shimmering experience, and I just ran back to my room and said, 'I love myself.' It was the first time I remembered talking to myself in the first person. I felt transformed.

Dialectical behavior therapy
Through her work, Linehan realized the importance of two concepts in mental health. One of these was that to achieve meaningful and happy lives, people must learn to accept things as they are. The other was that change is necessary for growth and happiness. These two concepts are the foundation of her therapy, DBT. DBT is used for treatment of borderline personality disorder (BPD), which is characterized by suicidal behavior. Along with treatment of BPD, it has also been used to treat other disorders such as eating and substance abuse disorders. DBT uses a multitude of techniques such as behavioral therapy, strategies that improve coping and regulation of emotion, and mindfulness skills. The significance of DBT is apparent as it is the only treatment shown to be effective in reducing suicidal behavior. More personally, it is significant to Linehan because of her own early struggles with mental health.

Honors and awards
Linehan has earned several awards for her research and clinical work, including the Louis Israel Dublin award for Lifetime Achievement in the Field of Suicide in 1999, the Distinguished Research in Suicide Award from the American Foundation of Suicide Prevention, creation of the Marsha Linehan Award for Outstanding Research in the Treatment of Suicidal Behavior presented by the American Association of Suicidology, the Distinguished Scientist Award from the Society for a Science of Clinical Psychology, the Distinguished Scientific Contributions to Clinical psychology award by the Society of Clinical Psychology, awards for Distinguished Contributions to the Practice of Psychology and Distinguished Contributions for Clinical activities  as well as The Outstanding Educator Award for Mental Health Education from the New England Educational Institute in 2004, and Career Achievement Award from the American Psychological Association in 2005.

Publications
Linehan has authored and co-authored many books, including two treatment manuals: Cognitive-Behavioral Treatment for Borderline Personality Disorder and Skills Training Manual for Treating Borderline Personality Disorder. She published a memoir about her life and the creation of dialectical behavior therapy Building a Life Worth Living: A Memoir in 2020. She has also published extensively in scientific journals, some of which include research on suicidal behavior such as the article "Modeling the suicidal behavior cycle: Understanding repeated suicide attempts among individuals with borderline personality disorder and a history of attempting suicide" while others contribute to her work on DBT like, "Behavioral assessment in DBT: Commentary on the special series".

Selected Book Publications 

 Building a life worth living: a memoir (2020)
 DBT skills training handouts and worksheets (2015)
 DBT skills training manual (2015)
 Opposite actions: changing emotions you want to change (2007)
 Understanding borderline personality disorder: the dialectical approach (1995)
 Cognitive-behavioral treatment of borderline personality disorder (1993)
 Skills training manual for treating borderline personality disorder (1993)

Personal life
Linehan is unmarried and lives with her adult adopted Peruvian daughter Geraldine "Geri" and her son-in-law Nate in Seattle, Washington.

Linehan is a long-time Roman Catholic and reports that she is involved in such practices as meditation that she was taught by Roman Catholic priests, including her Zen teacher Willigis Jäger.

See also
 Behaviorism
 Buddhism and psychology
 Behavioral therapy
 Cognitive behavioral therapy

Notes

References

External links
 

 

American psychology writers
Borderline personality disorder experts
1943 births
Living people
American women psychologists
21st-century American psychologists
American women non-fiction writers
Women science writers
American Roman Catholics
People with borderline personality disorder
Catholic University of America faculty
Loyola University Chicago alumni
Loyola University Chicago faculty
University at Buffalo faculty
University of Washington faculty
Writers from Tulsa, Oklahoma
Writers from Seattle
20th-century American non-fiction writers
21st-century American non-fiction writers
20th-century American women scientists
21st-century American women scientists
20th-century American women writers
21st-century American women writers
20th-century American psychologists